{{Speciesbox
| image =
| genus = Sphaerulina
| species = oryzina
| authority = Hara, (1918)
| synonyms = 
Cercospora janseana (Racib.) Constant., Cryptog. Mycol. 3(1): 63 (1982)
Cercospora oryzae T. Miyake, Journal agric. Tokyo 2: 263 (1910)
Napicladium janseanum Racib., (1900)Passalora janseana (Racib.) U. Braun, (2000)
}}Sphaerulina oryzina'' is a fungal plant pathogen infecting rice. Propiconazole is an effective fungicide recommended for use in rice culture.

References

External links
 
 
 
 

Fungal plant pathogens and diseases
Rice diseases
oryzina
Fungi described in 1918